Azem Mullaliu (born in Kavajë) is a retired Albanian footballer who played as a defender for Besa Kavajë in the Albanian Superliga during the 1970s. He was called up and played in several unofficial matches for the Albania national football team.

References

Year of birth missing (living people)
Living people
Footballers from Kavajë
Albanian footballers
Association football defenders
Besa Kavajë players
Albanian football managers
Besa Kavajë managers